The 1998 Abierto Mexicano Telcel was a men's tennis tournament played on Clay in Mexico City, Mexico that was part of the International Series of the 1998 ATP Tour. It was the sixth edition of the tournament and was held from 26 October – 1 November.

Seeds
Champion seeds are indicated in bold text while text in italics indicates the round in which those seeds were eliminated.

Draw

Finals

References

Doubles